"Nobody Knows" is a song by Swedish singer, Darin, released in February 2012 as the lead single from his's sixth studio album Exit. The song was written by Darin, Tony Nilsson, Niklas Rune and Bilal Hajji and produced by Nilsson.

Despite not having entered the Swedish Singles Chart, the single has sold over 40,000 copies in Sweden.

On 14 May 2013 the single was released throughout all Europe under the label Dex Music. On 16 May  Darin performed the two songs in a medley at the Eurovision Song Contest 2013 in Malmö, Sweden, as part of the interval act of the second semifinal.

Charts
Following his performance of the song on Allsång på Skansen, the song topped the Swedish Digital Singles Chart.

Certifications

Release history

References

2012 songs
2012 singles
Darin (singer) songs
Songs written by Bilal Hajji
Songs written by Darin (singer)
Songs written by Tony Nilsson